The Argentina men national roller hockey team is the national team side of Argentina at international roller hockey. It is part of FIRS Roller Hockey World Cup and CSP Copa America. In men Argentina won 5 World Cups and the only roller hockey tournament in the Olympic Games history, Barcelona 1992, and the women of Argentina won five World Cups.

Argentina squad - 64th Nations Cup 

Team Staff
 General Manager:
 Mechanic:

Coaching Staff
 Head Coach: Jose Martinazzo
 Assistant:

Titles

Men

FIRS Roller Hockey World Cup (5) 
 1978, 1984, 1995, 1999, 2015

Copa America (2) 
 2007, 2008

Montreux Cup of Nations (2)  
 1989, 1993

Roller Hockey Pan American Games (8) 
 1979, 1987, 1991, 1993, 1995, 2000, 2005, 2011

Roller Hockey Olympic Games (1) 
  1992

Rink Hockey South America Championship (12)  
1959, 1963, 1967, 1971,1975, 1977, 1981,2004 1984, 1985, 1987, 2004, 2022

Women

FIRS Roller Hockey World Cup (5) 
 1998, 2002, 2004, 2010, 2014

Copa America (2) 
 2006, 2010

Roller Hockey Pan American Games (2) 
 2005, 2018

Rink Hockey South America Championship (2) 
 2004, 2022

References

External links
Website of Argentinian Roller Sports Federation

National Roller Hockey Team
Roller hockey
National roller hockey (quad) teams